Marques del Duero may refer to:
 Spanish gunboat Marques del Duero
 Manuel Gutiérrez de la Concha, 19th-century Spanish military commander and politician
 Marqués del Duero (Madrid), equestrian statue in Madrid, Spain